BPM "Best Files" is the first compilation album by J-pop duo Two-Mix, released by King Records on March 13, 1997. The album covers the duo's singles, B-sides, and other tracks from 1995 to 1996. It also includes a bonus CD-ROM that features the music video for the single "White Reflection".

The album peaked at No. 6 on Oricon's weekly albums chart. It was also certified Gold by the RIAJ.

Track listing 
All lyrics are written by Shiina Nagano; all music is composed by Minami Takayama, except where indicated; all music is arranged by Two-Mix.

Charts

Certification

References

External links 
 
 

1997 compilation albums
Two-Mix compilation albums
Japanese-language compilation albums
King Records (Japan) compilation albums